Snap! Attack: The Best of Snap! is the first Greatest hits album from German Eurodance group Snap!.

Background
In 1996, and following the release of three studio albums, Snap! officially disbanded and released a greatest hits compilation called Snap! Attack: The Best of Snap!.

New versions of their hits "The Power" and "Rhythm Is a Dancer" were released as singles and both charted in Sweden at No.40 and No.58. However, these were not included on the track listing of the album.

Critical reception

Track listing
 The Power (7" Version)	(3:46) from World Power
 Ooops Up (7" Edit)	(3:57) from World Power
 Cult of Snap (World Power Radio Mix)	(3:59) from World Power
 Mary Had a Little Boy (Radio Edit)	(3:41) from World Power
 Colour of Love (Massive 7")	(3:59) from The Madman's Return
 Rhythm Is a Dancer (7" Edit)	(3:41) from The Madman's Return
 Exterminate (7" Edit)	(4:13) from The Madman's Return
 Do You See The Light (Looking For) (7")	(4:09) from The Madman's Return
 Welcome to Tomorrow (Are You Ready?)	(4:12) from Welcome to Tomorrow
 The First the Last Eternity (Till the End) (7" Edit)	(3:54) from Welcome to Tomorrow
 The World in My Hands (7" Mix)	(3:55) from Welcome to Tomorrow
 Rame (Original Version)	(3:54) from Welcome to Tomorrow
 Mega Mix (7" Edit) (4:39) Non-album single

Personnel
 Artwork By [Cover Production] – Anzilotti & Münzing Productions
 Artwork By [Design] – Alexandra Jugovic
 Vocals – Penny Ford (tracks: 1 to 4, 13), Turbo B. (tracks: 1 to 6, 13), Niki Haris (tracks: 7 and 8), Summer (tracks: 9 to 11)

Charts
"Snap! Attack: The Best of Snap!" peaked in the top 20 in Belgium, Germany and the Netherlands.

Year-end charts

References 

Snap! albums
1996 greatest hits albums